Bill: On His Own is a 1983 American made-for-television biographical drama film and a sequel to Bill (1981) starring Mickey Rooney as Bill Sackter. However, it was far less successful.

Cast
Mickey Rooney - Bill Sackter 
Helen Hunt - Jenny Wells 
Dennis Quaid - Barry Morrow 
Largo Woodruff - Beverly Morrow 
Edie McClurg - Angela 
Tracey Walter - Kenny 
Teresa Wright - Mae Driscoll 
Paul Lieber - Rabbi Portman 
Harry Goz - Tom Walz

References

External links

1983 television films
1983 films
1980s biographical drama films
American sequel films
American biographical drama films
CBS network films
Films about intellectual disability
Films directed by Anthony Page
Films shot in Houston
Television sequel films
American drama television films
1980s American films